The Tipperary is an IBA official cocktail made with Irish whiskey, sweet red Vermouth, green Chartreuse, and Angostura bitters.

See also
 List of cocktails

References

Cocktails with whisky
Cocktails with vermouth
Cocktails with liqueur
Cocktails with bitters
Cocktails with Angostura bitters
Cocktails with chartreuse